This is a list of all tornadoes that were confirmed by local offices of the National Weather Service in the United States in April 2015.

United States yearly total

April

April 2 event

April 3 event

April 7 event

April 8 event

April 9 event

April 11 event

April 12 event

April 13 event

April 14 event

April 16 event

April 17 event

April 18 event

April 19 event

April 20 event

April 21 event

April 22 event

April 23 event

April 24 event

April 25 event

April 26 event

April 27 event

See also
 Tornadoes of 2015
 List of United States tornadoes from January to March 2015
 List of United States tornadoes in May 2015

Notes

References

United States,04
2015,04
Tornadoes
Tornadoes,04